Junkee is an Australian popular culture and news website run by new media company Junkee Media. It covers various topics including film, university, food, TV, politics, travel, career, health and Internet culture. Its target demographic is 18- to 29-year-olds.

Junkee was launched in March 2013 by Sound Alliance, now known as Junkee Media. Its founding editors were Steph Harmon and Rob Moran.

It was voted the Mumbrella Media Brand of the Year in 2014's Mumbrella Awards.

References

External links 
 

Australian news websites